This is a timeline of the history of ITV in Wales, including the current service ITV Cymru Wales. It does not include events that affect the whole UK network.

1950s 
 1956
 26 October – Television Wales and the West is awarded the ITV franchise for South Wales and the West of England.

 1957
 No events.

 1958
 14 January – At 4:45pm, TWW starts broadcasting.

 1959
 No events.

1960s 
1960
 No events.

1961
Following pressure from Welsh-speaking businessmen, the ITA awards a licence covering a new North and West Wales region to Wales West and North Television.

1962
 14 September – Wales (West and North) Television launches as Teledu Cymru. This brings ITV to north Wales for the first time, although people living on north east Wales and along much of the north Wales coast had been able to watch ITV since 1956 as this area is within reach of the Winter Hill transmitting station and therefore served by Granada Television.

1963
Delays in switching on the transmitters at Arfon (north west) and Moel-y-Parc in the north east destroys the finances of WWN. Free programming from the ITV network, plus other support from its neighbours ABC, ATV and TWW just about kept the ship afloat, but Granada decided to dispense with its productions in the Welsh language, and the loss of this programming stream proved fatal to WWN.

1964
 26 January – Wales (West and North) Television stops broadcasting after going bankrupt. TWW offers a generous package to WWN's shareholders, in order to gain control of the territory, and kept the Teledu Cymru name on the air as a service separate from its existing service to South Wales and the West.

1965
 For the first time, TWW is able to provide separate programming for the whole of Wales and the West of England. This is made possible by the addition of a second VHF transmitter to the St Hilary mast to extend the Teledu Cymru service into south east Wales. Viewers in South Wales are able to receive both services.

1966
 No events.

 1967
 21 June – TWW loses its licence to the Harlech Consortium. TWW unsuccessfully fought the ITA's decision, both formally and through the press. However, the ITA remained resolute that it is legally entitled to remove any contract at any time for any reason.

 1968
4 March – TWW stops broadcasting five months before its contract was due to expire, selling the final months of airtime to Harlech. However the new contractor is not yet ready to go on air so the ITA provides an interim service called Independent Television Service for Wales and the West.
20 May – Harlech Television takes over the Wales and West of England franchise just over two months ahead of the planned hand-over date. It launches two news magazines – Y Dydd (The Day) in Welsh and Report Wales in English. They are broadcast for a full half-hour. Previously, TWW had provided short evening bulletins known as TWW Reports, presented jointly from studios in Cardiff and Bristol, where the station ran a joint news operation covering the two areas. 
 August – A technicians strike forces ITV off the air for several weeks although management manage to launch a temporary ITV Emergency National Service with no regional variations.
14 September – The final edition of listings magazine Television Weekly is published. Listings are subsequently carried in an Wales and West of England edition of TVTimes which now becomes a national publication on 21 September.

 1969
 No events.

1970s 
 1970
6 April – HTV starts broadcasting in colour and from this day, the station becomes known on air as HTV rather than Harlech Television. The service for Wales becomes known as HTV Cymru Wales. (HTV's "general" 405-line VHF service for South Wales and the West of England continues as a separate service).

 1971
 No events.

 1972
 16 October – Following a law change which removed all restrictions on broadcasting hours, HTV is able to launch an afternoon service.

 1973 
 No events.

 1974
 The 1974 franchise round sees no changes in ITV's contractors as it is felt that the huge cost in switching to colour television would have made the companies unable to compete against rivals in a franchise battle.

 1975
 No events.

 1976
 No events.

 1977
 No events.

 1978
 No events.

 1979
 10 August – The ten week ITV strike forces HTV off the air. The strike ends on 24 October.

1980s 
 1980
 No events.

 1981
 No events.

 1982
23 September – HTV launches a weekly current affairs programme Wales This Week. To this day, the programme continues to be broadcast.
 31 October – Programmes in Welsh are broadcast on HTV Cymru Wales for the final time as from the following day, all Welsh language programmes both on BBC Wales and HTV transfer to the new Welsh fourth channel S4C.
1 November – Following the launch of S4C, HTV's service in Wales becomes a fully English-language service, and is renamed "HTV Wales", and it renames its news programme to Wales at Six. However the "HTV Cymru Wales" name continues as the production credit for programmes made for S4C.
November – HTV launches a Welsh-language current affairs series on S4C called Y Byd ar Bedwar (The World on Four).

 1983
 1 February – ITV's breakfast television service TV-am launches. Consequently, HTV's broadcast day now begins at 9:25 am.

 1984
 HTV opens a new studio complex at Culverhouse Cross due to its current studios at Pontcanna not having space for expansion to accommodate an increase in studio production.

 1985
 3 January – The last day of transmission using the 405-lines system, ending HTV's "general" service to South Wales and the West of England.

 1986
 No events.

 1987
 7 September – Following the transfer of ITV Schools to Channel 4 (and S4C), ITV provides a full morning programme schedule, with advertising, for the first time. The new service includes regular five-minute national and regional news bulletins.
 28 September – HTV launches a new computer-generated ident.

 1988
 22 August – HTV begins 24-hour broadcasting.

 1989
 1 September – ITV introduces its first official logo as part of an attempt to unify the network under one image whilst retaining regional identity. HTV adopts the ident, and reverts to the name "HTV Cymru Wales" instead of "HTV Wales".

1990s 
 1990
 April – Stereo broadcasts begin in Wales following the switching on of NICAM digital stereo from the Wenvoe transmitting station.

 1991
 28 April – HTV closes down its Night Club and replaces it with a simulcast of the overnight generic service from London.
 16 October – HTV retains its licence to broadcast when it bids the highest amount of a total of four applicants, although it is financially damaged by the process.

 1992
 No events.

 1993
 1 January – To coincide with the start of this new franchise period, HTV launches a new set of idents.

 1994
 18 February – Flextech buys a 20% stake in the company, thereby clearing HTV's debts.
28 February – Wales at Six is replaced by Wales Tonight.

 1995
 1 January – HTV launches a new set of idents.
 September – Flextech sells its 20% stake in HTV to Scottish Television.

 1996
 October – United News & Media buys Scottish Television's 20% stake in HTV.

 1997
 28 June – HTV is fully taken over by United News & Media.

 1998
 15 November – The public launch of digital terrestrial TV in the UK takes place.

 1999
 8 March – Wales Tonight is renamed HTV Wales News.
 8 November – A new, hearts-based on-air look is introduced and HTV adopts its version of the ident.

2000s 
 2000
 Granada plc buys United's television interests, but competition regulations limited the extent to which one company could control the ITV network, and Granada was consequently forced to give up one of its ITV franchises. This resulted in a break-up of HTV, whereby its broadcast facilities and Channel 3 broadcast licence (and hence its advertising revenues) are sold to Carlton Communications plc, owners of Carlton Television, whilst the majority of production facilities are retained by Granada.

 2001
 No events.

 2002
 28 October – On-air regional identities are dropped apart from when introducing regional programmes and HTV's service in Wales is renamed ITV1 Wales.

 2003
 No events.

 2004
 January – The final two remaining English ITV companies, Carlton and Granada, merge to create a single England and Wales ITV company called ITV plc.
 2 February – HTV News is renamed ITV Wales News.

2005
 The Ferryside television relay station in Carmarthenshire is chosen as the site of the UK's experimental switchover trial, and as such becomes the first UK TV transmitter to be converted to digital transmission.
 14 November — ITV Wales News is renamed back to Wales Tonight.

 2006
 29 December – HTV Ltd is renamed ITV Wales & West Ltd.

 2007
 No events.

 2008
 No events.

 2009
 9 September – Digital switchover begins in Wales when the Kilvey Hill transmitter is the first of eight main transmitters to complete digital switchover.

2010s
2010
 31 March – Digital switchover is completed in Wales when the analogue transmissions at Wenvoe are switched off.

2011
 11 January – ITV Wales +1 is launched.

2012
 No events.

2013
14 January – As part of a rebranding of ITV Wales, a new logo is introduced and the Wales news magazine is renamed ITV News Cymru Wales in 2013.
22 September – A new weekly current affairs programme, Newsweek Wales, is launched and is broadcast at Sunday lunchtime.

2014
1 January – ITV in Wales is now officially known as ITV Cymru Wales, and gains its own franchise instead of being part of the "Wales and West" franchise.
30 June – ITV Cymru Wales moves into a new facility on the ground floor of 3 Assembly Square, located next to the Welsh Assembly in Cardiff Bay and to mark the change, the Wales at Six name is reintroduced after 20 years.

2015
 25 August – ITV Cymru Wales begins broadcasting in HD.

See also 
 History of ITV
 History of ITV television idents
 Timeline of ITV
 Timeline of television in Wales

References

ITV in Wales|Wales
ITV in Wales|Wales